Peter Kaukonen (born Benson Lee Kaukonen on September 23, 1945) is an American guitarist/multi-instrumentalist/songwriter based in the San Francisco Bay Area. He is the younger brother of Jorma Kaukonen from Jefferson Airplane and Hot Tuna. Peter Kaukonen has played, toured, and recorded with Jefferson Airplane, Jefferson Starship, Hot Tuna, Johnny Winter, Link Wray, Terry Allen, Ruthann Friedman (author of "Windy"), as well as his own band, Black Kangaroo.

Kaukonen plays both acoustic and electric guitars, acoustic and electric bass, mandolin, bouzouki, lap steel guitar and piano. His influences are Chicago and Delta blues, fingerpicking guitar, New Age-style acoustic music, rock and roll, jazz and classical music.

Kaukonen's songwriting spans 40 years—from early power trio songs written for Black Kangaroo and covered by Jefferson Airplane to instrumental compositions. He attended Stanford University.

Discography
with Black Kangaroo
Black Kangaroo – Grunt Records FTR-1006 (1972)
Black Kangaroo – Wounded Bird 106 (2007)
"Prisoner" / "Dynamo Snackbar" – Grunt Records single 65-0507 (1972)
"Up or Down" / "That's a Good Question" – Grunt Records single 65-0510 (1972)

Solo
Going Home – Veldt 1001 (2004)
Beyond Help – Veldt 1002 (2004)
The Archives 1976 - 2006 – Veldt 1003 (2006)
Traveller – Veldt 1004 (2007)

Guest appearances
Blows Against the Empire – RCA Records LSP-4448 (by Paul Kantner and Jefferson Starship) (1970)
Sunfighter – Grunt Records FTR-1001 (by Paul Kantner and Grace Slick) (1971)
Be What You Want To – Polydor PD-5047 (by Link Wray) (1973)
Manhole – Grunt Records BFL1-0347 (by Grace Slick) (1974)
Juarez – Fate Records  (by Terry Allen) (1975)
Jefferson Airplane – Epic Records 90036 (by Jefferson Airplane) (1989)

References

External links
 

1945 births
Living people
American multi-instrumentalists
Jewish American musicians
Musicians from the San Francisco Bay Area
Hot Tuna members
Jefferson Starship members
American people of Finnish descent
American people of Russian-Jewish descent
21st-century American Jews
Stanford University alumni